Urmanchino (Urmansı) is a rural locality (a village) in Laklinsky Selsoviet, Salavatsky District, Bashkortostan, Russia. The population was 405 as of 2010. There are 7 streets.

Geography 
Urmanchino is located 32 km east of Maloyaz (the district's administrative centre) by road. Russkoye Ilchikeyevo is the nearest rural locality.

References 

Rural localities in Salavatsky District